"Janie Runaway" is the fourth single from Steely Dan's 2000 album Two Against Nature.

Personnel 

Drums: Leroy Clouden
Bass/Guitars: Walter Becker
Rhodes: Ted Baker
Wurlitzer/Lead Vocals: Donald Fagen
Alto sax solo: Chris Potter
Backup vocals: Carolyn Leonhart
Trumpet: Michael Leonhart
Alto sax: Lou Marini
Tenor sax: Lawrence Feldman
Bass clarinet: Roger Rosenberg

References

2000 songs
Steely Dan songs
Songs written by Donald Fagen
Songs written by Walter Becker
Giant Records (Warner) singles